Marianne Maderna (born 1944) is an Austrian installation artist.

Life 
Maderna's mother, Katharina, was a publisher's reader, her father the young people's writer Karl Bruckner. Maderna attended the Graphic Training and Research Institute in Vienna, Austria, from 1959 to 1964, then emigrated to the US. She returned to Austria in the same year and graduated from the Academy of Fine Arts Vienna in 1969 (MA 1972). In 1991 she was awarded the Honorary Prize of Lower Austria, and in 1996 the City of Vienna Prize for Visual Art. Maderna lives in Vienna and Aggsbach in Lower Austria. In 2014 she participated in the foundation of the MMMuseum in the Aggsbach Charterhouse.

Her works can be found in the Artothek des Bundes im 21er Haus, Vienna, the Blickle Foundation, the Austrian Museum of the 21st Century, the Albertina Graphic Collection, the MUSA Collection of the City of Vienna, LENTOS Kunstmuseum Linz, the State Museum of Lower Austria, and the Austrian Sculpture Park in Graz.

Work 
Marianne Maderna is an interdisciplinary installation artist and performer. Her work discusses social themes relevant to the human condition, combining sculpture, video, drawing, endurance performance, improvised music and poetic texts. Maderna examines and finds new formulations for human behavior patterns and hierarchical systems. In a climbing performance in 2005 she painted a Viennese flak tower from the Second World War with graffiti. In 2013 she presented her world-theater Humanimals at the Dominican Church in Krems.  This was large spatial installation with thousands of nocturnally glowing hanging sculptures and a hand-drawn 3D animation as a walk-in video projection. In the same year she walked over the Danube as a female pope in self-constructed aqua shoes. In 2015, on the occasion of the 650th anniversary of the University of Vienna, Marianne Maderna presented 36 busts of famous women in juxtaposition to the 153 permanently installed busts and plaques of male notables. 

_

Solo exhibitions 
 2015 Radical Busts, Arkadenhof, University of Vienna
 2014 Foundation of the MMMuseum in the Aggsbach Charterhouse
 2013 Humanimals, Dominican Church / Krems, Zeitkunst, Lower Austria
 2011 Mighties & Frighties & Academy mm, Palais Kabelwerk / Artspace, Vienna
 2006 One To, kunsthaus muerz, Mürzzuschlag
 2005 One To, Academy of Fine Arts Vienna
 2005 Budhines, Christines ..., installation and graffiti performance, Flakturm Arenbergpark, Vienna
 1996 Das erste Haus, Architekturzentrum Wien Museumsquartier, Vienna
 1991 Raum und Ausgang, Wiener Secession
 1987 Skulpturen im Umraum, Wiener Secession
 1984 Skulpturen und Zeichen, Landesmuseum Niederösterreich, Vienna
 1982 Marianne Maderna, Wiener Secession

Catalogues 
 Radical Busts, with texts by Maia Damianovic, Sigrid Schmitz, and Luce Irigaray. Poems: Marianne Maderna
 Humanimals. Zeitkunst Lower Austria, with texts by Eva Badura, Maia Damianovic, and Alexandra Schantl, Verlag für moderne Kunst, Nürnberg 2013, 
 Historysteria, with texts by, Kerstin Braun, Jacques Derrida, Sophie Freud, Elisabeth List, Elisabeth von Samsonow, Springer, Vienna, New York et al. 2008, 
 Raum und Ausgang, with texts by Jacques Derrida, Hildegunt Amanshauser, Ulli Moser, Marianne Maderna, Wiener Secession, Vienna. 1991, 
 Raum und Ausgang, with facsimile text, Triton Verlag, Vienna 1997,

References

External links 
 Website of Marianne Maderna
 Marianne Maderna in the databank Gedächtnis des Landes on the history of Lower Austria, Landesmuseum Niederösterreich
 
 Zeitkunst Lower Austria: Marianne Maderna. Humanimals
 Ursula Blickle Video Archiv: Marianne Maderna
 Videoportrait by CastYourArt, 2013: Künstlerporträt Marianne Maderna
 Review in Der Standard: "Radical Busts": 33 Frauen im Kreise von 153 Männern
 Review by orf.at: 33 goldene Frauenbüsten an der Uni Wien
 Exhibition: Radical Busts by Marianne Maderna: 3.3-26.4.2015 (Arkadenhof der University of Vienna)

External links

1944 births
Living people
20th-century Austrian women artists
Artists from Vienna
Austrian installation artists
Women installation artists
Austrian sculptors
Academy of Fine Arts Vienna alumni
Interdisciplinary artists